The 13th Boat Race took place on the River Thames on 15 March 1856.  Typically held annually, the event is a side-by-side rowing race between crews from the Universities of Oxford and Cambridge.   The race, the second to be held on the ebb tide, was won by Cambridge who beat Oxford by half a length.

Background

The Boat Race is a side-by-side rowing competition between the University of Oxford (sometimes referred to as the "Dark Blues") and the University of Cambridge (sometimes referred to as the "Light Blues").  The race was first held in 1829, and since 1845 has taken place on the  Championship Course on the River Thames in southwest London.  It was the second race to be held on the ebb tide, the first time since the 1846 race, from Barker's Rails to Putney, approximately  longer than the conventional course.  Oxford went into the race as reigning champions, having defeated Cambridge by seven lengths in the previous race held in 1854.  Cambridge led overall with seven wins to Oxford's five.

No Boat Race took place in 1855 – severe frost had caused both the Thames (from Oxford to Henley) and the River Cam to freeze, and heavy snow curtailed efforts to practice for the race.  Instead the universities faced each other at the Henley Royal Regatta where Cambridge won the Grand Challenge Cup.  Despite the victory, Cambridge agreed that they should propose the challenge to Oxford and did so during the October term; it was duly accepted. Both crews raced in boats constructed by Searle.  The umpire for the race was W. G. Rich, the former Cambridge University Boat Club president who had rowed in both the March and December races of 1849.  The starter was Edward Searle.

Crews
None of the competitors had taken part in a previous Boat Race.

Race

Cambridge won the toss and elected to start from the Middlesex station, handing the Surrey side of the river to Oxford.  The race commenced shortly after 11 a.m. with Oxford taking an early lead.  Cambridge's number six, M'Cormick, caught a wave with his oar by the Ship pub and lost his seat, allowing Oxford to extend their lead. After recovering, Cambridge made a substantial push and passed Oxford to hold a small advantage, to hold a half-a-length by Barnes Bridge.  Although they nearly increased their lead to a length, the Light Blues encountered a barge at Corney Reach which caused them to change course and lose ground, enabling Oxford to draw level once again.  The crews exchanged leads with Oxford shooting Hammersmith Bridge with a half-length advantage.  Cambridge steered closer to the shore and retook the lead. Despite a late surge from the Dark Blues, Cambridge passed the finish first, winning by half a length in a time of 25 minutes 45 seconds.   It was Cambridge's first win in four attempts and their eighth win overall against Oxford's five victories.

References
Footnotes

Sources

External links
 Official website

1856 in sports
The Boat Race
March 1856 sports events